Louis Schwabe (1798-1845) was a manufacturer of silk and artificial silk fabrics in Manchester.   He was noted for his pioneering work in the use of spinnerets for the production of an artificial glass based yarn.

References

Textile engineering
Textile workers
People of the Industrial Revolution
1798 births
1845 deaths